Georgenia is a genus of Actinomycete bacteria.

References

Micrococcales
Bacteria genera
Soil biology